Bentley House may refer to:

in England
 Bentley House (East Sussex), a historic house in East Sussex, England

in the United States
(by state)
 Rev. Doc. Robert Bentley House, a city-designated landmark in Berkeley, California that was home to Archetype Press
 Bentley House (Springfield, Missouri), a place of interest in Springfield, Missouri
 Crowninshield-Bentley House, Salem, Massachusetts
 George Bentley House, Worcester, MA, listed on the NRHP in Massachusetts
 Matthew R. Bentley House, a historic place in Red Cloud, Nebraska
 Parks-Bentley House, a historic place in South Glens Falls, New York
 Melius-Bentley House, Ancram, NY, a historic place in Pine Plains, New York
 Wilson Alwyn "Snowflake" Bentley House, a historic place in Jericho, Vermont